The 2018–19 ICC T20 World Cup Africa Qualifier was the tournament played as part of qualification process for the 2021 ICC T20 World Cup.

Twelve regional qualifiers were held by the International Cricket Council (ICC), with 62 teams competing during 2018 in five regions – Africa (3 groups), Americas (2), Asia (2), East Asia Pacific (2) and Europe (3). The top 25 sides from these progressed to five Regional Finals in 2019, with seven teams then going on to compete in the 2019 ICC T20 World Cup Qualifier, along with the six lowest ranked sides from the ICC T20I Championship.

The first African sub-regional qualifier (North-Western sub region) was held in Nigeria, with the two other groups staged in Botswana and Rwanda. The top two teams in each group advanced to the regional finals tournament, which will determine two African entrants to the 2019 ICC T20 World Cup Qualifier. In April 2018, the International Cricket Council (ICC) granted full international status to Twenty20 men's matches played between member sides from 1 January 2019 onwards. Therefore, all the matches in the Regional Finals were played as Twenty20 Internationals (T20Is).

From the North-Western sub region group, both Ghana and Nigeria qualified for the Africa Regional Finals. Simon Ateak of Ghana was named the player of the tournament in the North-Western group. The second group, the Eastern sub region, started on 7 July 2018. Both Kenya and Uganda qualified for the Africa Regional Finals from the Eastern sub region group. Uganda's Riazat Ali Shah was named the player of the tournament for the Eastern group. From the Southern sub region group, Botswana and Namibia qualified for the Africa Regional Finals.

The Regional Finals were held in Uganda in May 2019. Namibia and Kenya both progressed to the T20 World Cup Qualifier after finishing first and second respectively in the Regional Finals. In July 2019, the ICC suspended Zimbabwe Cricket, with the team barred from taking part in ICC events. As a result of their suspension, the ICC confirmed that Nigeria would replace them in the T20 World Cup Qualifier tournament.

Teams

North-Western sub region

The North-Western sub region group was held in Nigeria from 14 to 21 April 2018.

Points table

(H) Host, (Q) Qualified to next stage

Fixtures

Eastern sub region

The Eastern sub region group was held in Rwanda from 7 to 14 July 2018.

Points table

(H) Host, (Q) Qualified to next stage

Fixtures

Southern sub region

The Southern sub region group was held in Botswana from 28 October to 3 November 2018.  Zambia, initially listed as an entrant, withdrew before the tournament draw was released.

Points table

(H) Host, (Q) Qualified to next stage

Fixtures

Regional Finals

The Regional Finals were held in Uganda from 20 to 24 May 2019, with the top two sides progressing to the 2019 ICC T20 World Cup Qualifier tournament in the UAE. Originally, the finals were scheduled to start on 19 May, but all three fixtures were washed out, with the matches rescheduled for the tournament's reserve day. Ahead of the final day of fixtures, Kenya, Namibia and Nigeria were all in contention of finishing in the top two places and progressing to the 2019 ICC T20 World Cup Qualifier tournament. However, all of the matches on the last day were washed out, therefore Namibia and Kenya both progressed to the T20 World Cup Qualifier after finishing first and second respectively in the Regional Finals.

In August 2019, the ICC confirmed that Nigeria had also progressed to the T20 World Cup Qualifier, after Zimbabwe had been suspended from taking part in international cricket tournaments in the previous month.

Points table

Fixtures

Notes

References

External links
 Africa group at the International Cricket Council
 Series home at ESPN Cricinfo (Finals)

ICC Men's T20 World Cup Qualifier
International cricket competitions in 2018–19
International cricket competitions in 2019
2021 ICC Men's T20 World Cup